Kálmán  is an ancient Germanic origin Hungarian surname and male given name. Outside Hungary, the name occurs sometimes in the form Kalman. It was derived from the Germanic name:  Koloman, Coloman or Kolman. The Germanic name Coloman has been used by Germans since the 9th century.

Kalman ( in Yiddish and Hebrew, occasionally spelled Calman in Roman letters) is also a Yiddish given name that is a short form of the Greco-Jewish name Kalonymos (meaning "beautiful name", a reference to a miracle worked in God's name). Sometimes the long form and short forms are used together, as in the compound name Kalman Kalonymos.

The Yiddish and Hungarian names are a convergence with separate origins (the Yiddish name first appearing in the Rhineland in the middle ages with the famed Kalonymos family).

People with the name Kalman or Kálmán include:

Surname 
 Attila Kálmán (born 1968), Hungarian organist and pianist
 Charles Kálmán (1929–2015), Hungarian-Austrian Jewish composer; (de)
 Dan Kalman (born 1952), American mathematician
 Emmerich Kálmán (1882–1953), composer of operettas
 Maira Kalman (born 1949), Israeli-American graphic designer and illustrator
 Oszkár Kálmán (1887–1971), Hungarian bass singer
 Rudolf E. Kálmán (1930–2016), Hungarian mathematician and electrical engineer
 Tibor Kalman (1949–1999), Hungarian graphic designer

Given name
 Kalman Aron (died 2018), a Latvian-born American Jewish artist
 Kalman J. Cohen (died 2010), an American Jewish economist
 Kálmán Bartalis (1889–?), a Hungarian polo player
 Kalman Bloch (1913–2009), a US Jewish clarinetist
 Kálmán Darányi (1886–1939), a Hungarian politician
 Kálmán Ferenczfalvi (1921-2005 in Debrecen) was a Hungarian Righteous Among the Nations
 Kálmán Giergl (1863–1954), a Hungarian architect
 Kálmán Gőgh (1948, Kladno–1995)
 Kálmán Hazai (1913–1996), a Hungarian water polo player
 Kálmán Hunyady de Kéthely (1828–1901), a Hungarian nobleman
 Kálmán Ihász (born 1941), a Hungarian footballer
 Kálmán Kalocsay (1891–1976)
 Kálmán Kandó (1869–1931)
 Kálmán Kánya (1869–1945), a Foreign Minister of Hungary
 Kálmán Katona (born 1948), a Hungarian politician
 Kálmán Kertész (1867–1922), a Hungarian entomologist
 Kálmán Kittenberger (1881–1958), a Hungarian traveller, natural historian, biologist
 Kálmán Konrád (1896–1980), a Hungarian football player
 Kalman Konya (born 1961, Zürich), a Switzerland-born Hungarian-German shot putter
 Kálmán Kovács (disambiguation)
 Kálmán Kubinyi (1906, Cleveland–1973, Stockbridge, Massachusetts), a Hungarian-American influential etcher
 Kalman Kahana (1910–1991), an Israeli politician and journalist
 Kalman Liebskind (born 1970), an Israeli journalist.
 Kalman Mann (1912-1997), 8th director general of Hadassah Medical Organization
 Kálmán Markovits (born 1931), a Hungarian water polo player
 Kalman Menyhart (born 1955), a Hungarian football player
 Kálmán Mészöly (born 1941), a former Hungarian football (soccer) player
 Kálmán Mikszáth (1847–1910), a Hungarian novelist, journalist, politician
 Kalman Odes (1925–2022), a Jewish Lithuanian WW2 hero, lawyer, Beekeeper Одес-мед
 Kálmán Petrikovics, a Hungarian sprint canoer
 Kalman Packouz, a US orthodox rabbi
 Kalman Mayer Rothschild (1788-1855), founder of the Rothschild banking family of Naples
 Kálmán Rózsahegyi (1873–1961), a Hungarian actor and teacher
 Kalman Schulman (1819–1899), a Lithuanian writer and translator
 Kálmán Sóvári (born 1940), a Hungarian footballer
 Kálmán Sóvári (wrestler) (1910–1996), a Hungarian wrestler
 Kálmán Szabó (born 1980), a Hungarian football player 
 Kálmán Széll (1843–1915), a Hungarian politician
 Kálmán Thaly (1839–1909), a Hungarian poet, historian and politician
 Kálmán Tihanyi (1897–1947), a Hungarian physicist, electrical engineer, inventor
 Kálmán Tisza (1830–1902)
 Kálmán Tóth (poet) (1831–1891), a Hungarian poet

Middle name
 Moses Kalman Rothschild (1688-1735), German Jewish silk trader, money changer, father of Amschel Moses Rothschild (1710-1755)
 Kalonymus Kalman Epstein (born c. 1753, Neustadt, now Poland)
 Kalonymus Kalman Shapira (1889–1943), Grand Rabbi of Piaseczno
 Jón Kalman Stefánsson (born 1963), Icelandic author
 Karl Kalman Targownik (1915-1996), psychiatrist and Holocaust survivor

Mononym
 Coloman of Hungary, king of Hungary (1095–1116)
 Prince Kálmán (Coloman) of Lodomeria (1208–1241), a Hungarian member of the Árpád dynasty, Prince of Halych
 Coloman, Bishop of Győr (1317–1375)

See also 
 (Kallmann (disambiguation), Kallman, Calman, Callmann, Callman)–other Jewish given names and variants
 Koloman (Coloman)

References

Hungarian masculine given names